Martín Tejera Vázquez (born 16 February 1991) is an Uruguayan footballer who played as a goalkeeper in different teams and retired in 2016.

Career

Honours

Club

Nacional

Uruguayan Primera División (3): 2008–09, 2010–11, 2011–12

References

1991 births
Living people
Footballers from Montevideo
Uruguayan footballers
Uruguayan expatriate footballers
Association football goalkeepers
Uruguay youth international footballers
Club Nacional de Football players
Boston River players
C.A. Rentistas players
C.D. Quevedo footballers
C.A. Progreso players
Uruguayan Primera División players